An inhaler is a device used for delivering medication into the body via the lungs.

Inhaler may also refer to:

Inhaler (album), by Tad, 1993
"Inhaler", song by Hooverphonic, from the album A New Stereophonic Sound Spectacular, 1996
"Inhaler", song by Cordelia's Dad, from the album What It Is, 2002
"Inhaler" (Miles Kane song), released only as a single, 2010
 "Inhaler" (Foals song), from the album Holy Fire, 2012
 Inhaler (band), Irish band